One of the potential pitfalls for observers trying to interpret the operation of bikeways (or segregated cycle facilities) is that the same legal assumptions do not apply in all environments. For instance, in contrast to most English speaking countries, some European countries, including Germany, France, Denmark, Belgium, and the Netherlands have defined liability legislation. Thus there is a legal assumption that motorists are automatically considered liable in law for any injuries that occur if they collide with a cyclist.  This may hold regardless of any fault on the part of the cyclist and may significantly affect the behaviour of motorists when they encounter cyclists.

In some countries it is legal for cyclists to pass a motor-vehicle on its kerb-side, and cyclists doing so may enjoy the protection of the law. In this case, the use of segregated cycle facilities conforms to existing traffic law. In other jurisdictions similar "undertaking" manoeuvres by cyclists are illegal.  Such distinctions form the basis of the claim by John Forester that segregated cycle facilities encourage behaviours that flout existing traffic law and in which cyclists enjoy no legal protection.

Cyclists in some countries are also given separate rules and light phases at traffic signals and cyclist-specific traffic lights. For instance, in Germany and elsewhere at junctions with segregated facilities all the traffic in a given direction (motorists, pedestrians and cyclists) may get a green signal at the same time.  Turning motor traffic is obliged to wait for cyclists and pedestrians to clear the junction before proceeding. In this situation all the transport modes get equal green time. In contrast, UK and Irish practice restricts pedestrians to a dedicated signal phase, separate from and usually much shorter than the green phase for motorists (e.g. 6–12 seconds, vs. signal cycle times of up to 120 seconds).  If cyclists were to be segregated and treated in a similar manner this would imply a significant reduction in green time for cycle traffic at every junction. In the English city of Cambridge the use of cyclist-specific traffic signals is reported to have resulted in increased delays for cyclists, leading some to ignore the cycle-facilities and stay on the road.  A similar example occurred in a Parisian bikepath scheme in 1999. Cyclists faced twice the number of traffic signals as motorised traffic and were expected to wait over one minute to get seven seconds of green time. Conversely, in Copenhagen cyclist-specific traffic signals on a major arterial bike lane have been linked to provide "green waves" for rush hour cycle-traffic, which time the lights so cyclists going an average speed are much more likely to encounter green lights on their trip.

Legal significance of on-road cycle facilities for various countries 
{|class="wikitable"
! !! Marked and reserved !! Marked limit, but not reserved !! Shared cycle facilities
|-
|| Description || Motorists are typically excluded from driving or parking, and cyclists might be obligated to use if available. || Motorists allowed to drive or park, cyclists not obligated to use. || No lane marked, typically a painted symbol or sign with legal access for cyclists and motorists
|-
| Austria || Radfahrstreifen ("cycle lane"), continuous line, traffic sign "obligatory cycleway" || || Mehrzweckstreifen ("multi-purpose lane", similar to shoulder)
|-
| Belgium 
|| fietspad (Flemish) = piste cyclable (French), no distinction from cycletrack in Belgian legal terminology, marked by dashed lines on both sides
|| fietssuggestiestrook= bande cyclable suggérée (suggested cycle lane), coloured ground (but never in red) with pictograms 
|| sharrows on a shared lane
|-
| Canada<ref>Thunder Bay (Ontario): [http://www.thunderbay.ca/Assets/Living/Active+Transportation/docs/Bike+Lanes+Shared+Lanes+Pamphlet.pdf Informations for motorists and cyclists on shared lanes and bike lanes] </ref> ||| The use of bikelanes is not obligatory for cyclists in any Provinces.||  ||| shared lanes, car lanes with shared lane markings ("sharrows").
|-
| Czech Republic ||| vyhrazený (cyklistický) jízdní pruh or "reserved (cycle-) lane", limited by a continuous line, signed "cycletrack" || cyklistický jízdní pruh = "cycle lane", limited by a dashed line, simple bicycle pictograms ||| files of shared lane markings are called piktogramový koridor or cyklopiktokoridor, they have sharrows and no marked border
|-
| France ||| bande cyclable obligatoire ("obligatory cycle lane"), continuous line, traffic sign "obligatory cycleway". bande cyclable conseillée et réservée (recommended & reserved cycle lane), non-oblligatory, dashed line, sign "facultative cycleway", pictograms like on shared lanes || ||| voies partagées (shared lanes) with shared lane markings.
|-
| GermanyAllgemeine Verwaltungsvorschrift zur Straßenverkehrs-Ordnung (VwV-StVO) (General administrative rule for the application of the traffic law – in German) 
|| Radfahrstreifen ("cycle lane"), continuous line, traffic sign "(obligatory) cycleway" 
|| Schutzstreifen ("protective lane"), dashed line and simple bicycle pictograms: Normally cars have to keep left, cyclists right of the border, but for certain reasons it may be traversed, mutually. 
|| The traffic laws provide shared use only in bus lanes, but do not forbid shared lane markings in ordinary lanes; simple bike pictograms
|-
| Italy ||| corsia ciclabile (cycle path) ||  ||
|-
| NetherlandsFietsersbond: Wat is een fietspad en wat is een fietsstrook? (What's a cycletrack and what's a cycle lane – in Dutch) 
|| fietsstrook met doorgetrokken streep, "bicycle lane with continuous line". Fietsstrook met onderbroken streep, "bicycle lane with dashed line", also obligagtory for cyclists but shared by motorists
| | fietssuggestiestrook ("suggested cycle lane"), no obligation nor reservation, no bicycle pictograms, red ground (and mostly a dashed line) or distinctive texture ||
|-
| PolandSejmu RP: Prawo o ruchu drogowym ||| pas rowerowy ||  ||
|-
| Switzerland || Radstreifen, colloquially Velostreifen (both mean "cycle lane"), limited by yellow continuous lines (only exceptional) || Radstreifen, colloquially Velostreifen (both mean "cycle lane"), limited by yellow dashed lines  || rare use because disapproved by federal law
|-
| United Kingdomwww.gov.uk: Department for Transport: Know Your TRAFFIC SIGNS Official Edition || mandatory cycle lane, reserved but not obligatory, limited by a continuous line ||| Advisory cycle lane, not reserved, limited by a dashed line ||
|-
| United States 
|| In all states the use of bikelanes is not obigatory for cyclists. ||| Dashed cycle lanes still only have an "experimental" status. In contrast to shared lanes, the equality of rights for cyclists here is limited to a lane-in-lane. 
| | shared lanes, car lanes with shared lane markings ("sharrows")
|}

 Legal significance of cycle tracks in European countries 
Cycle tracks typically exclude all motorized vehicles for most countries. Some exceptions are made, such as in the Netherlands, for light motorbikes. Some jurisdictions require cyclists to use cycle tracks if present (obligatory cycle tracks) or allow cyclists to either use the cycle track or a parallel roadway (facilitative cycle tracks).

 In the United Kingdom, cycletracks are defined as cycleways physically separated from the carriageway. Their usage is not obligatory, I. e. cyclists may also ride on the parallel carriageway. They may not ride on the sidewalk, but pedestrians are allowed to walk on the cycletrack, if there is no sidewalk.
 In the Netherlands, most major roads have cycletracks and most cycletracks (fietspaden) exclude motorized vehicles and cyclists are required to use them if available. Light motorbikes are allowed and obliged to use some cycle tracks marked as fiets- en bromfietspaden. Non-obligatory cycletracks are rare but where they exist, they are indicated by signs using the word fietspad'' instead of a bicycle logo.
 In Belgium, the traffic law does not distinguish roadside cycletracks from cyclelanes on the carriageway. All roadside cycletracks exclude motorized vehicles and cyclists are obliged to use them.
 In France, cycletracks and cycle lanes exclude all motorized traffic. Until 1998 cyclists were obligated to use them if present. By law, most cycletracks ought to be facilitative ("conseillée et réservée", reserved and recommended), but most local authorities are delaying the replacement of round panels (obligatory) by rectangular ones (advisory).
 In 1997, Germany changed the law that using the road is the standard. Roadside cycletracks can only made obligatory for safety reasons and must have minimum physical standards (width, straightness). The non-obligatory ones have to be visible by design, but no panel sign existed. Since beginning of 2014, there is the possibility to signpost bidirectional non-obligatory roadside cycletracks using additional panels. There are big differences among the local applications of these laws. Extreme cases are the two cities with the highest cycling rates: in Münster, on almost all cycletracks cyclists are obligated to use them if present, in Bremen more than 75% are not. In Bremen, some cycle tracks have been displaced by traffic calming on the carriageway or by cycle lanes. Also Berlin, Cologne, Munich and Hamburg are making campaigns to convert obligatory cycletracks to facilitative ones or to displace them by cycle lanes (especially Hamburg)
 In Poland cycle tracks exclude motorized vehicles and can be marked as obligatory or facilitative cycletracks.
 In Italy, all cycle tracks exclude motorized vehicles and require cyclists to use them if present.
 In Switzerland, all cycle tracks exclude motorized vehicles and require cyclists to use them if present.
 In Austria, cycle tracks exclude motorized vehicles and since 2014 have made them optional for cyclists, with rectangular signs to differentiate from the typical round signs. A similar rectangular version was created for combined foot-and-cycleways and for cycleway and adjacent footway.
 Austrian cycletrack signs

Strict Liability
A number of European countries, including Austria, Denmark, France, Germany, Italy, the Netherlands and Sweden, apply a strict liability towards cyclists, protecting them. For example, in the Netherlands, the law assumes the stronger participant (e.g. a car driver) is liable in the case of an accident with a weaker participant (e.g. a cyclist) unless it can be proved that the cyclist's behavior could not have been expected.

See also 
 Cyclability

References

Road safety
Cycling infrastructure
Transportation planning